The 1895 Minnesota Golden Gophers football team represented the University of Minnesota as an independent the 1895 college football season. It was the only season under head coach Pudge Heffelfinger.

On January 11, 1895, the Presidents of several schools met in a preliminary meeting and formed a group which would become the Intercollegiate Conference of Faculty Representatives, known today as the Big Ten Conference.

As a result of this emerging conference, this season was Minnesota's last season as an independent. Minnesota won its first ever match with Chicago with a last minute touchdown to win a very close, physical game by a score of 10–6. Financially, the team rebounded from some lean years. They "secured a large subscription from the business men of the city, the attendance at all of the games was good, and at the close of the season there was a large surplus in the treasury."

Schedule

Roster
 Ends, Jack Harrison (left end); Thomas M. Kehoe (right end)
 Tackles, John S. Dalrymple (left tackle); Willis J. Walker (right tackle)
 Guards, Augustus T. Larson (captain and left guard); George A.E. Finlayson (right guard)
 Center, James C. Fulton
 Quarterback, Charles E. Adams
 Halfbacks, George T. Pettibone (left halfback); Henry C. Loomis (right halfback)
 Fullback, H.A. Parkyn
 Substitutes, Clinton L. Walker, Martin Teigen, Ivan A. Parry, Stanley H. Bissell, John B. Loomis, H.B. Gilbert
 Trainer, Edward "Dad" Moulton 
 Coach, Pudge Heffelfinger

References

Minnesota
Minnesota Golden Gophers football seasons
Minnesota Golden Gophers football